The Jeep Wrangler (JL) is the fourth generation of the Wrangler off-road vehicle, available in two- and four-door bodies. Unveiled at the 2017 Los Angeles Auto Show on November 29, 2017, production of the vehicle began in November 2017.

Design

The 2-door Wrangler and 4-door Wrangler Unlimited feature an exterior design that is reminiscent of the 1997 through 2006 Wrangler (TJ), with a "raked" front grille with seven vertical slots and round headlamps that integrate into the front grille. The designers have moved the traditional Jeep logo off the grille.

The Wrangler has retained a body-on-frame construction and solid axles. The vehicle is offered with three different four-wheel drive systems: Command-Trac, Selec-Trac, and Rock-Trac. Options available on all JL models (except Rubicon) include an anti-spin rear differential. The JL is designed to be more comfortable on-road and has recirculating ball steering with electric power assistance.

The new Wrangler is roughly  lighter than the Wrangler JK. Overhangs increase significantly with the new model having  front and rear.

Powertrain
The 3.6 L Pentastar VVT V6 gasoline engine still remains available from the existing Wrangler and Wrangler Unlimited, and is standard on all models, though has been redesigned for improved fuel economy. The engine features an Aisin AL6 six-speed manual transmission as standard equipment, with an 850RE Torqueflite eight-speed automatic transmission being optional. The automatic transmission made its debut in the 2018 Jeep Grand Cherokee (WK2), replacing the older Torqueflite 845RE unit. The eight-speed automatic unit will feature a traditional shifter. This is only offered on Wrangler models sold in North America, Middle East, Australia, and New Zealand.

A 2.0 L turbocharged four-cylinder (Inline-4) FCA Global Medium Engine is available on all models. Paired exclusively with the 850RE Torqueflite eight-speed automatic transmission, the new engine features a mild hybrid system branded as eTorque for improved fuel economy and off-road performance, and produces  and  combined. This is the only gasoline engine offered in Europe, China, Singapore, and India. In North America, this engine had late availability, and the Wrangler was launched with the existing 3.6 L Pentastar V6 gasoline engine.

A 3.0 L EcoDiesel V6 turbodiesel engine, built by VM Motori, became available in North America in 2020 (same engine already available in the Jeep Grand Cherokee (WK2) and the Ram 1500.)

A plug-in hybrid model called the 4xe was released in 2021. It is available in China, Europe, and the United States. For 2022, the 4xe became the only variant of the Wrangler offered in Europe.

A V8 powered version of the Rubicon trim level debuted for the 2021 model year.

In-vehicle infotainment 
There are three updated infotainment systems (Uconnect 3 5.0BT, Uconnect 4 7.0, and Uconnect 4C 8.4N). The different Uconnect infotainment systems supply 5-inch, 7-inch, or 8.4-inch pinch-to-zoom displays.

The base Sport and upgraded Sport S both feature the standard Uconnect 3 5.0BT system, while the uplevel Sahara and Rubicon both feature the Uconnect 4 7.0 system with Apple CarPlay and Android Auto, which is also optional on the upgraded Sport S, when equipped with the Electronic Infotainment Group. The Uconnect 4C 8.4N system is only available on the uplevel Sahara and Rubicon models when equipped with the Electronic Infotainment II Group. SiriusXM Satellite Radio is standard on all models aside from the base Sport, where it is available as a standalone option.

An eight-speaker audio system, with dashboard and rear "sound bar" mounted speakers is standard on all models, whereas an optional nine-speaker Alpine premium amplified audio system that adds an all-weather subwoofer, is a standalone option on all models, also included with the Electronic Infotainment Group and Infotainment II Group on Sport S, Sahara, and Rubicon models.

All three infotainment systems include a fully integrated and federally mandated rear-view backup camera as standard equipment. The camera is mounted to the spare tire and can be disconnected when the tire is removed.

Rear passengers now get a 115 V AC household-style power outlet, as well as rear USB charging ports on Wrangler Unlimited models.

Interior

The interior design was inspired by the 1954–1983 Jeep CJ-5 and 1987–1995 Wrangler (YJ) models. The majority of the interior switchgear in the JL is unique to the JL, except for some parts which are shared with other Chrysler products.

The power window controls remain in the center of the instrument panel, and the front woofers remain in the lower corners of the instrument panel. There is a new three-spoke, retro-inspired steering wheel, and a color instrument cluster display screen is available on upper-level trims.

Standard cloth seating surfaces are standard on Sport and Sport "S", while upgraded Premium Cloth seating surfaces are standard on Sahara and Rubicon models (the upgraded seats include either 'SAHARA' or 'RUBICON' embroidery on the front seat backrests, depending on model). Luxury leather-trimmed seating surfaces are standard on the MOAB and 392 trim level, and optional only on Sahara and Rubicon models (the front seat backrests are also embroidered with either the 'SAHARA', 'MOAB', 'RUBICON', or 'RUBICON 392' logos, depending on model). Interior colors are either Black or Heritage Tan for cloth-equipped models, or Black or Saddle on leather-equipped models. All models can be equipped with heated front seats and a heated leather-wrapped steering wheel. Rubicon models equipped with the Black interior include exclusive red stitching on the seats and steering wheel, while Moab models feature contrasting gray stitching, and the 392 has bronze stitching. Black Katzkin leather-trimmed seating surfaces are available as a Mopar dealer-installed accessory option for all trim levels, in either standard or perforated trim.

Cloth-equipped models include a real metal dashboard surface (Silver-painted on Sport, Sport "S", and Sahara models, and Red-painted on some Rubicon models, dependent on the exterior color choice). Leather-equipped Sahara and MOAB include an interior color-keyed stitched vinyl dashboard.

Safety

Safety improvements include standard side-impact airbags and strengthened B-pillars. Driver-assist safety features are located in the Active Safety group.

The JL has a lowered beltline with larger windows for better outward visibility. The rear spare tire has been moved down to increase rear visibility. LED front headlamps and rear tail lamps are available, as are daytime running lamps (DRL's) on the front fenders. A blind spot monitor is built directly into the taillight housing.

Euro NCAP
The JL received 1 star from Euro NCAP in 2018.

IIHS

In 2020, a 4-door JL Wrangler Unlimited overturned upon impact with the rigid barrier during the IIHS's 40-mph small overlap test. When the vehicle struck the barrier, the front axle tucked underneath the Wrangler's structure, causing the vehicle to ride over its own axle and land on its side. While the Wrangler's structure had minimal intrusion and the dummy had minor injury readings, the IIHS concluded that the risk of a passenger being ejected from the vehicle was too high and gave the Wrangler a "Marginal" rating. Despite claims from Jeep that the JL Wrangler's structure was modified to prevent the same outcome, the vehicle overturned again during a retest for the 2022 model, despite some minor suspension changes, resulting in another "Marginal" rating.

The 2022 Wrangler was safety tested by the IIHS:

Production

Production of the Wrangler Unlimited began in November 2017, while two-door Wrangler production will commence in early 2018. As with its predecessors, the JL is produced at Jeep's Toledo Complex in Toledo, Ohio, and also was produced alongside its predecessor, the Wrangler JK, which remained in production until April 27, 2018. The simultaneous sales were to ensure that dealerships could meet demand. The 2018 Wrangler JK was virtually unchanged from the 2017 model, and a Wrangler JK decal on the front fenders distinguished the outgoing model from its successor. The plant which produced the JK will temporarily close as it receives a retooling for the upcoming Wrangler-based Jeep Gladiator.

FCA announced that the Toledo Machining Plant would assemble the power electronics module and components for the Jeep Wrangler Plug-in Hybrid which was intended to be launched in 2020, but was actually presented in 2021.

Marketing

Before the JL's actual debut at the 2017 Los Angeles Auto Show, the song Believer by Imagine Dragons was used in the opening. In the teaser, it uses 7 letters that are narrowed to represent the 7 vertical slots and 2 circles on the left and right to depict the front fascia.

A debut television advertisement for the 2018 Wrangler JL, entitled "Jeep Jurassic", first aired during Super Bowl LII. The ad is a reenactment of the classic Tyrannosaurus rex chase scene from the 1993 movie Jurassic Park. However, instead of a 1992 Wrangler (YJ) Sahara Edition, Jeff Goldblum, who played Ian Malcolm in the movie, drives a silver two-door 2018 Wrangler JL Rubicon with red accents. The commercial ends with Goldblum seated in the driver's seat of the aforementioned Jeep in a showroom, where a Jeep saleswoman asks if he would like to take the JL for a test drive, to which Goldblum replies that he has.

Pickup truck

The all-new 2020 Jeep Gladiator was introduced at the 2018 Los Angeles Auto Show on November 28, 2018. Based on the Wrangler JL, the Gladiator features exterior and interior styling cues similar to the Wrangler Unlimited, seating for five passengers, and a five-foot pickup bed.

Awards and recognition

 Autotrader's Must Test Drive Award
2019 SUV of the Year for Jeep Wrangler Rubicon by Four Wheeler
 Northwest Automotive Press Association's Northwest Outdoor Activity Vehicle of the Year for Jeep Wrangler Unlimited
"Off-road Utility Vehicle" and "Midsize SUV" of Texas by the Texas Auto Writers Association
Highest Resale Value in the Compact SUV segment by J.D. Power
SEMA 4x4/SUV of the Year by the Specialty Equipment Market Association (SEMA)
Motor Trend's SUV of the Year.
ALG Residual Value Award for Off-Road Utility segment

Wrangler sales

Notes

References

External links

Official Jeep Site 

Wrangler JL
Euro NCAP large off-road
Cars introduced in 2017